Yaakov Kamenetsky (February 28, 1891 – March 10, 1986), was a prominent rabbi, rosh yeshiva, posek and Talmudist in the post-World War II American Jewish community.

Biography
Yaakov Kamenetsky was born at a folwark called Kalyskovka owned by his grandfather Samuel-Hirsh Kamenetsky, Russia, in 1891. Shortly afterwards his family moved to the village of Dolhinov where he grew up. He studied in Minsk and then for 21 years in Slabodka yeshiva under Rabbi Nosson Tzvi Finkel. It was there that he met his lifelong friend Rabbi Aharon Kotler, who later founded the Lakewood yeshiva. His younger cousin, Rabbi Yaakov Yitzchak Ruderman, also grew up in Dolhinov.

Kamenetsky was appointed rabbi of Tzitavyan in 1926 and moved to North America in 1937, where he initially took rabbinical positions in Seattle and then (from 1938-1945) Toronto. From 1948 to 1968 he headed Mesivta Torah Vodaath in Brooklyn, New York. After leaving the yeshiva he moved to Monsey, New York, where he focused on publishing his books. Along with Rabbi Moshe Feinstein, Reb Yaakov (as he was affectionately called) led American Jewry in issues of halachic and spiritual guidance until 1986, when both men died.

He was renowned as "Chakima D'Yehudai", the wise man of the Jews. Aside from his extensive Torah scholarship, he was known for his ever-present warm smile and his expertise in Hebrew grammar. He was an advocate for English-language sefarim, even commenting that quality English-language sefarim will be used by Jews in the Messianic era as, like Yiddish in its time, "today English has become a language of Torah."

Family
Kamenetsky's first wife was Itta Ettil (Heller) Kamenetsky, who died on July 9, 1954.  In 1958, Kamenetsky married Chana Urman of Toronto.  The officiator at Kamenetsky's marriage to  Chana was his close friend and colleague, Rabbi Zelik Epstein.  Chana died shortly after her husband in 1986.

Kamenetsky's son, Rabbi Shmuel Kamenetsky, heads the Talmudical Yeshiva of Philadelphia and chairs the Moetzes Gedolei HaTorah. His other sons are: Rabbis Binyamin (1923–2017), founder of the Yeshiva of South Shore in Long Island, NY, Nathan (1930-2019), vice Rosh yeshiva at Yeshivas Itri, and author of Making of a Godol on his father, and Avraham (1930–2013). His oldest daughter, Malka (1921–2013), was married to Rabbi Yisrael Shurin (d. 2007). A second daughter, Rivka, was married to Rabbi Hirsch Diskind (1922–2013), the long-time Dean of Bais Yaakov of Baltimore.

Dozens of his descendants serve in key leadership positions across North America in other countries. They include: Rabbis Mordechai Kamenetzky, Dean of the Yeshiva of South Shore, Shalom Kamenetsky, Rosh Yeshivas Philadelphia, Avraham Kamenetsky, R"M in Yeshivas Beis Yisrael in Jerusalem, Yosef Kamenetsky, Rosh Kollel in Moscow, Zvi Kamenetzky, Dean of the Dwek Ohr HaEmet Sephardic Academy of Toronto, and Yitzchak Shurin, Dean of Midreshet Rachel-Shapell's. His grandson Dov Shurin is a singer-songwriter and musician.

Works
Emes leYaakov al HaShas ("Truth to Jacob") – a five-volume work with in depth commentary on the Talmud.
Emes leYaakov al Shulchan Aruch – a volume with commentary and rulings on Shulchan Aruch, The Jewish Code of Law
Emes leYaakov (Formerly known as Iyunim BaMikra) – a two volume commentary on Torah and Prophets, which includes grammatical observations on the Hebrew of the Bible (dikduk).

See also 
 Reb Yaakov: The Life and Times of HaGaon Rabbi Yaakov Kamenetsky

References

External links
Biography Rabbi Yaakov Kamenetsky
 Intellectual profile of R' Yaakov

1891 births
1986 deaths
20th-century Lithuanian rabbis
Haredi rabbis in Europe
Canadian Haredi rabbis
American Haredi rabbis
Moetzes Gedolei HaTorah
Belarusian Jews
Torah Vodaath rosh yeshivas
Slabodka yeshiva alumni
20th-century American rabbis